Ali Al Bukhaiti (born 10 September 1976) is a Yemeni politician, journalist and writer. He was a spokesman for the Houthi movement, until deciding to split up from them. He moved between Saudi Arabia, Jordan and Lebanon, and currently lives in the United Kingdom. He wrote several political articles published on many sites, and appeared on news channels such as BBC, RT, Al-Jazeera, Al-Arabiya and Al-Hurra. Al-Bukhayti was close to the former Yemeni president Ali Abdullah Saleh. He attacked the Houthis and their practices in Yemen, and as a result, he and his relatives were subjected to harassment and threats from them. In 2019, Al-Bukhaiti declaring it "Irreligion", and attacked the Islam and its rulings. He and his family came under pressure because of this.

References 

Yemeni politicians
Arab atheists
British former Muslims
Yemeni atheists
Former Muslims turned agnostics or atheists
Houthi members
Living people
Yemeni former Muslims
1976 births